Boone Township is one of fourteen townships in Cass County, Indiana, United States. As of the 2010 census, its population was 1,484.

History
Boone Township was organized in 1836 or 1838.

Geography

Cities and towns
 Royal Center

Adjacent townships
 Van Buren Township, Pulaski County (north)
 Wayne Township, Fulton County (northeast)
 Harrison (east)
 Noble (southeast)
 Jefferson (south)
 Jackson Township, White County (southwest)
 Cass Township, White County (west)

Major highways
  U.S. Route 35
  Indiana State Road 16

Cemeteries
The township contains three cemeteries: Cline, Royal Center and Thompson.

References
 
 United States Census Bureau cartographic boundary files

External links

Townships in Cass County, Indiana
Townships in Indiana
1830s establishments in Indiana
Populated places established in the 1830s